Marcelo Pogolotti (1902–1988) was a Cuban painter.  Born in Havana, the son of Dino Pogolotti, he spent his childhood between Cuba and Europe, beginning his artistic study in Italy.  He briefly studied engineering and philosophy in the United States before entering the Art Students League to study painting.  He was attracted to surrealism and futurism, incorporating elements of both into his work.  He exhibited at numerous venues in both Cuba and Europe before losing his vision in 1938.  He later returned to Cuba and became an essayist, novelist and critic, living both there and in Mexico.  He died in Havana in 1988.

References
Biography at soycubano.com
Veerle Poupeye. Caribbean Art.  London; Thames and Hudson; 1998.

1902 births
1988 deaths
Cuban male writers
20th-century Cuban painters
20th-century Cuban male artists
People from Havana
Male painters